Gibbaranea is a genus of  orb-weaver spiders first described by Allan Frost Archer in 1951.

Species
 it contains thirteen species:
Gibbaranea abscissa (Karsch, 1879) – Russia (Far East), China, Korea, Japan
Gibbaranea bifida Guo, Zhang & Zhu, 2011 – China
Gibbaranea bituberculata (Walckenaer, 1802) – Europe, Turkey, Israel, Russia (Europe to Far East), Central Asia to China, Japan, India
Gibbaranea bruuni Lissner, 2016 – Portugal, Spain, Algeria, Tunisia
Gibbaranea gibbosa (Walckenaer, 1802) – Europe, Turkey, Caucasus
Gibbaranea g. confinis (Simon, 1870) – Spain, France (Corsica)
Gibbaranea hetian (Hu & Wu, 1989) – Russia (South Siberia), China, Mongolia
Gibbaranea indiana Roy, Saha & Raychaudhuri, 2015 – India
Gibbaranea nanguosa Yin & Gong, 1996 – China
Gibbaranea occidentalis Wunderlich, 1989 – Azores
Gibbaranea omoeda (Thorell, 1870) – Europe, Russia (Europe to Far East), Japan
Gibbaranea tenerifensis Wunderlich, 1992 – Canary Is.
Gibbaranea ullrichi (Hahn, 1835) – Europe to Central Asia

References

Araneidae
Araneomorphae genera
Spiders of Asia